András Balogh (born 6 March 1944) is a Hungarian historian, diplomat, and former ambassador to Thailand. His party, the Hungarian Socialist Party (MSZP) nominated him to the position of President of Hungary in 2010. During a parliamental election  the Fidesz-Christian Democratic People's Party's candidate Pál Schmitt was elected by an overwhelming majority.

Publications
Társadalom és politika a gyarmati Indiában (1979)
A gyarmati rendszer története 1870–1955 (1980)
A Political History of National Liberation Movement in Asia and Africa 1914–1985 (1988)
Nemzet és történelem Indiában (1988)
A nemzeti kisebbség és a nemzetközi biztonság (1994)
A magyar külpolitika prioritásai (1996)
Integráció és nemzeti érdek (1998)
Világpolitikai átrendeződés szeptember 11-e után (2001)
Nemzet és nacionalizmus (co-author, 2002)

External links

Biography (Hungarian)

Ambassadors of Hungary to Thailand
Ambassadors of Hungary to India
Hungarian Socialist Party politicians
Hungarian diplomats
20th-century Hungarian historians
Writers from Budapest
Living people
1944 births
Candidates for President of Hungary
21st-century Hungarian historians